The 2019 Harvey Norman NSW Women's Premiership will be the fifteenth season NSW Women's Premiership, the top tier women's rugby league competition administered by the New South Wales Rugby League. The competition acts as a second-tier league to the NRL Women's Premiership teams.

Teams 
In 2019, 11 clubs will field teams in the NSW Women's Premiership.

 Cabramatta Two Blues
 Canterbury-Bankstown Bulldogs
 CRL Newcastle
 Cronulla-Sutherland Sharks
 Mount Pritchard Mounties
 North Sydney Bears
 Penrith Brothers
 South Sydney Rabbitohs
 St Marys Saints
 Wentworthville Magpies
 Wests Tigers

Ladder 
Source:

Results

Round 1 
Source:

Round 2 
Source:

Round 3 
Source:

Round 4 
Source:

Round 5 
Source:

Round 6 
Source:

Round 7 
Source:

Round 8 
Source:

Round 9 
Source:

Round 10 
Source:

Round 11 
Source:

Round 12 
Source:

Round 13 
Source:

Round 14 
Source:

Round 15 
Source:

Round 16 
Source:

Round 17 
Source:

Finals Series

Grand Final

See also

Rugby League Competitions in Australia

References

External links

Women's rugby league competitions in Australia
2019 NRL season
2019 in women's rugby league
2019 in Australian women's sport